This is a list of organizations, conferences, and prizes for women writers.

Organizations and conferences
Broad Universe
Hedgebrook
International Women's Writing Guild (1976-)
Kali for Women (1984-)
Kentucky Women Writers Conference (1979-)
Philippine American Women Writers and Artists (1991-1998)
Sisters in Crime (1986-)
Wiscon
Women's Library (London)

Literary awards which focus on gender

James Tiptree, Jr. Award: SFF which focuses on gender
Lambda Literary Award: LGBT themes
Orange Prize for Fiction: Awarded to women writers
Pat Lowther Award 
Susan Smith Blackburn Prize: women playwrights
Tagea Brandt Rejselegat: Danish award for women academics and writers
Willa Literary Award: American award presented by Women Writing the West (WWW)

See also 
Women's writing in English

References 

Feminist literature
 
Writing
Organizations
Organizations